Flying Fox is a rural locality in the Scenic Rim Region, Queensland, Australia.

Geography 
The locality consists of a pair of north-south valleys. The watercourse Flying Fox Creek rises to the south (Beechmont) and flows north through the eastern valley of the locality of Flying Fox exiting to the north (Ferny Glen) where it becomes a tributary of the Coomera River. An unnamed creek also rises to the south (Beechmont) and flows north through the western valley of the locality of Flying Fox where it becomes a tributary of Flying Fox Creek on the locality's northern boundary.

History 
Flying Fox State School opened on 21 June 1920 and closed in 1962. It was on the western side of Upper Coomera Road near the Coomera River (approx ), now within the present-day boundaries of neighbouring Ferny Glen.

The locality contained 19 households, in which 53.8% of the population were males and 46.2% of the population were females with a median age of 41, 3 years above the national average. The average weekly household income was $2,399, $961 above the national average.

Education 
There are no schools in Flying Fox. The nearest government primary schools are Canungra State School in Canungra to the north and Beechmont State School in neighbouring Beechmont to the south-east. The nearest government secondary schools are Tamborine Mountain State High School in Tamborine Mountain to the north and Nerang State High School in Nerang to the north-east.

References 

Scenic Rim Region
Localities in Queensland